

Motorways
 M4 Motorway (Pakistan) (Pindi Bhattian) - (Multan)
 M3 Motorway (Pakistan) (Lahore) - (Abdul Hakeem)

Highways
 Faisalabad Canal Expressway

Main Roads

Flyovers in Faisalabad
 Nishatabad Flyover
 Abdullahpur Flyover
 novelty bridge Flyover (Approved)
 Tariqabad Bridge to Chak Jhumra Road (Approved)
 JHal Khanuana Chowk Flyover

Underpasses 
 Nusrat Fateh Ali Khan Underpass
 Barakat Ali Underpass
 Jhall Road Underpass
 Lyallpur Underpass
 Chenab Chowk Underpass (Planning)
 Novelty Underpass (Approved)
 Kashmir Bridge Underpass

See also
 List of places in Faisalabad

External links
 Faisalabad

Faisalabad
Streets in Faisalabad
Faisalabad-related lists